Glenuig is a small village in Moidart, Lochaber, Highland, on the west coast of Scotland.

Geography
Glenuig  is a tiny community of just over thirty folk located in the parish of Moidart in remote west Lochaber. Nowadays it is taken to include the neighbouring settlements of Samalaman and Alt Ruadh, and contains 21 houses in permanent occupation plus four holiday homes.

Access to Glenuig by public road was only made possible in 1966, and mains electricity arrived in 1983. A growing population of young people saw the revival of Glenuig Village Hall Committee in 1982, running the village hall situated in the old School Room. In 1993 the Hall Committee changed to become Glenuig Community Association.

History
The area has been inhabited for thousands of years and the traces of these earlier residents are everywhere around. The coastal regions here are wild and rocky, but because of the warmer climate within the last two thousand years the inland areas were productive and heavily populated. In the last two hundred years, the population declined through enforced clearances of the glens for sheep and voluntary emigration from the harsher coastal regions to the new colonies, particularly Cape Breton and America.

From 1783 to 1803, Samalaman House, on the outskirts of Glenuig, was the location of a Roman Catholic seminary

Prior to 1966 access was by foot or horseback (from either Lochailort or Kinlochmoidart) or by boat. Since that year the area has been accessible by good modern roads, train or bus.

Facilities

Nowadays Glenuig is a thriving and friendly community. Occupations include fishing, crofting, building, craftwork and IT, and of course catering for the many visitors to the area. The community has a tiny but busy shop and post office and a variety of accommodation choices in Glenuig, Kinlochmoidart, Roshven and Lochailort.

The village hall is one of the most splendid on the west coast and a very popular venue for entertainment. There is regular traditional folk music, fiddlers, blues bands, opera and dance and a range of community activities ranging from yoga, playgroups and youth nights to the meetings of the Moidart Local History Group.

Glenuig Community Association (GCA) has been responsible for several initiatives in the area. Through determined fundraising, notably through the Glenuig Music Festival (1983–1993) the local community built the magnificent Glenuig Hall.

Glenuig Hall is owned and managed by the GCA, and the Association is currently looking into the future of the village shop, hoping to build new premises and re-open the shop to be run as a Community Enterprise.

Gallery

References

Populated places in Lochaber